John Baptist Nsubuga Mukasa (January 1967 - June 2021), was a Ugandan neurosurgeon, who served as a Consultant Neurosurgeon at Mulago National Referral Hospital. He concurrently served as a Senior Lecturer in the Department of Neurosurgery at Makerere University School of Medicine. He died in Kampala, from complications of COVID-19 infection on 29 June 2021.

Background and education
He was born  in the Central Region of Uganda. After attending local primary and secondary schools, he was awarded a scholarship to study human medicine at Luhansk State Medical University, in the Ukraine, graduating with a medical degree from there. Later, he went to the Huazhong University of Science and Technology, Wuhan, Hubei, China, where he specialized as a neurosurgeon. His areas of sub-specialization included (a) neurotrauma (brain and spinal cord) (b) pediatric neurosurgery and (c) spinal cord surgery.

Career
At the time of his death, John Baptist Mukasa was one of only 13 neurosurgeons in Uganda, whose national population was estimated at 47 million then. He is remembered fondly by his colleagues, co-workers, neurosurgeons, residents, medical students that he taught and mentored and the many patient he operated on and/or went out of his way to assist. These include Juliet Sekabunga Nalwanga, Uganda's first female neurosurgeon who was trained by Mukasa. Dr Mukasa also had operating privileges at UMC Victoria Hospital in Bukoto, in the northern part of Kampala, Uganda's capital city.

Personal
Dr Mukasa is survived by a widow and two sons.

See also
 Betty Mpeka

References

External links
 Covid-19: Medics who have died in line of duty As of 1 July 2021.

 
1967 births
2021 deaths
Ugandan neurosurgeons
Ganda people
Luhansk State Medical University people
Huazhong University of Science and Technology alumni
People from Kampala
Deaths from the COVID-19 pandemic in Uganda